Eken Babu is a Bengali web series streaming on Hoichoi. The web series is based on Ekenbabu detective story which is written by Sujan Dasgupta. It's quite hard to believe Eken Babu as detective who actually looks like an ordinary Bengali man who earns a little by solving matters as a detective. Produced by the Eyewash Production season 1 of Eken Babu was released on 3 March 2018 With 6 episodes directed by Anirban Mallik. Later on 10 November in the same year hoichoi released the second season of the web series but this time the series was directed by Anupam Hari. The series stars Anirban Chakraborti in the titular role, Shoumyo Banerjee, and Debapriyo Bagchi in the main roles. The production company, Shree Venkatesh Films, announced, in 2021, that a film titled The Eken will be made for a theatrical release in 2022. After five successful seasons, Eken Babu will return for the sixth time in the web space in December 2022, as mentioned on 20 September 2022, at Hoichoi season 6— this time the centre of the adventure being Kolkata itself. Also, on 1 November 2022, SVF officially announced that The Eken is returning for its second installment in 2023.

Cast 
 Anirban Chakraborty as Eken Babu
 Shoumo Banerjee as Bapyaditya or Bapi
 Debapriyo Bagchi (Bubble) as Promotho
 Suhotra Mukhopadhyay as Bapi (Since Season 6)
 Somak Ghosh as Promotho (Since Season 6)
 Shreya Sinha as Rupal Mehra
 Yash Roshan as Mamud (in Season 3)
 Shahdul Alam Sachchu as Jamal (in Season 3)
 Ziaul Hasan Kislu as Masud (in Season 3)
 Shimul Khan as Mr. Khan (in Season 3)
 Quazi Nawshaba Ahmed as Meherunisa (in Season 3)
 Anuradha Mukherjee (in Season 4)
 Kaushik Chatterjee (in Season 4)
 Kaushiki Guha (in Season 4)
 Debopriyo Mukherjee (in Season 4)
 Chitra Vanu Basu (in Season 4)
 Kinjal Kumar Nanda (in Season 4)
 Mridul Chandra Sen (in Season 4)
 Sohini Banerjee (in Season 4)

Episodes

Season 1 (2018)
Directed by Anirban Mallik the Season 1 of Eken Babu was started streaming on Bengali OTT platform hoichoi from 3 March 2018. It was based on the story Manhattane Moonstone.

Episodes

Season 2 (2018)
Season 2 of Eken Babu was released on 10 November 2018 with brand new six episodes directed by Anupam Hari.

Episodes

Season 3 (2019)
The third season of Eken Babu web series was launched on 28 November 2019 with brand new five episodes but this time the series was directed by Abhijit Chowdhury. In the third season of Eken Babu the story is mainly based on Bangladesh and most of the shooting is also done in Bangladesh. It was based on the story Dhaka Rahasyo Unmochito.

Episodes

Season 4 (2020)
On 2 October 2020 hoichoi released the 4th season of Eken Babu with six new episodes.

Episodes

Season 5 (2021)
On 8 October 2021, hoichoi released the 5th season of Eken Babu with six new episodes. The season is directed by Anirban Mullick. It is based on Santiniketane Osanti.

Episodes

Season 6 (2022)
On 20 September 2022, hoichoi announced the 6th season of Eken Babu. The series started streaming from 23rd December 2022.

Season 6 Episodes

Movie
On 19 November 2021, Shree Venkatesh Films, the production company that heads hoichoi, announced that a film titled The Eken will be made with the same cast and crew. The film was released in theatres on 14 April 2022. The film was shot in the hill station of Darjeeling. It was based on the story Manhattan a Madman. On 1 November 2022, SVF officially announced that the second installment of this film will be shot in December 2022, in Rajasthan. The name of the film will be 'The Eken: Ruddhoshwash Rajasthan. The director will be Joydeep Mukherjee and Anirban Chakrabarti, Suhotra Mukhopadhyay, Somak Ghosh, Sandipta Sen and Rajatava Dutta will be cast in the central roles.

References

External links

Indian web series
2017 web series debuts
Bengali-language web series
Hoichoi original programming